Transformers: Titans Return is an animated web series developed by Eric S. Calderon, Adam Beechen and F.J. DeSanto, and produced by Machinima, Inc. and Hasbro Studios, with the animation handled by Tatsunoko Production. Based on the Transformers franchise, it is the sequel to Transformers: Combiner Wars and the second installment of the Prime Wars Trilogy.

The series premiered in the United States on November 14, 2017 on go90, and was later streamed internationally on YouTube on January 9, 2018.

Premise 
After the Combiner Wars ended, Cybertron started to be rebuilt. However, an undead Starscream has been reincarnated as Trypticon, wreaking havoc around him. To combat this menace, Windblade gathers up a ragtag team of Transformers, including Optimus Prime and Megatron, to resurrect an ancient ally. And while some may be forever changed by the events, others may not emerge with their sparks intact.

Cast 

For this series, various actors return from Combiner Wars alongside new cast members, including Transformers veterans Peter Cullen, reprising his role as Optimus Prime, and Judd Nelson, reprising his role as Rodimus Prime / Hot Rod from The Transformers: The Movie and Transformers Animated.

 Peter Cullen as Optimus Prime
 Charlie Guzman as Menasor
 Michael Dorn as Fortress Maximus
 Rob Dyke as Devastator
 Jason David Frank as Emissary
 Mark Hamill as Megatronus / The Fallen
 Jason Marnocha as Megatron
 Lana McKissack as the Mistress of Flame
 Judd Nelson as Rodimus Prime / Hot Rod
 Nolan North as Metroplex
 Matthew Patrick as Computron
 Patrick Seitz as Overlord
 Frank Todaro as Starscream / Trypticon
 Abby Trott as Windblade
 Kari Wahlgren as Victorion
 Wil Wheaton as Perceptor
 Tay Zonday as the Chorus of the Primes

Episodes 

The series consists of roughly ten minute episodes. The first two episodes premiered for the U.S. audience on November 14, 2017 via go90, followed by a weekly release of new episodes every Tuesday. For international viewers, the first two episodes were released on January 9, 2018 on Machinima's official YouTube channel (as well as Hasbro's, but their uploads were since privatized), and all remaining episodes later appeared on YouTube on January 23, 2018.

Sequel 
Titans Return was followed by a third and final instalment titled Transformers: Power of the Primes, which was released from May 1, to July 3, 2018. Mark Hamill, Ron Perlman, Mikey Way, Jaime King, Gregg Berger, and Samoa Joe lent their voices to Megatronus / The Fallen, Optimus Primal, Snarl, Solus Prime, Grimlock, and Predaking respectively.

References

External links 
 Full series on Rooster Teeth

2010s American adult animated television series
American adult animated action television series
American adult animated web series
Anime-influenced Western animated television series
Titans Return